Bill Scott (born 1956) is a contemporary abstract painter and printmaker who works and lives in Philadelphia. Beginning in 2004 Scott has been represented by Hollis Taggart where he has had nine solo exhibitions.

Education
Scott was raised in Haverford in suburban Philadelphia and studied painting at the Pennsylvania Academy of the Fine Arts from 1974 to 1979. Throughout this time he also studied informally with the painter Jane Piper (1916–1991) whose studio he visited frequently.

In 1980, while living in Paris on a travel prize, he met the American abstract expressionist painter Joan Mitchell (1925–1992). In subsequent years he stayed at her home in Vétheuil and painted in her studio. After Mitchell died, he wrote an appreciation of her published in Art in America.

Career
Scott had his first solo exhibition in 1980 in Philadelphia. From 1989 to 1997 he exhibited in New York with Prince Street Gallery, an artist-run co-op gallery. His paintings have been the subject of solo and group exhibitions in New York, London, Philadelphia and San Francisco.

Since 1999 Scott has been making intaglio prints with the C.R. Ettinger Studio and in 2004 was awarded a grant from the Independence Foundation in support of his work in color printmaking. He has made commissioned etchings for the Print Club of Cleveland and for the Print Center and Fleisher Art Memorial, both in Philadelphia. In 2016 an exhibition devoted to his intaglio prints was presented by Philadelphia’s Cerulean Arts Gallery.

His paintings, pastels, and intaglio prints are in public collections including, the Asheville Art Museum, the British Museum, Cleveland Museum of Art, Delaware Art Museum, the Philadelphia Museum of Art, and Woodmere Art Museum. In 2017 Rider University organized an exhibition including 22 of his works dating from 1997 to 2017.

Scott’s exhibitions have been reviewed in a number of arts publications, including Art in America, ARTnews, The New York Times, and The Philadelphia Inquirer.

In addition to his painting and printmaking, Scott has maintained a lifelong interest in the work of French Impressionist painter, Berthe Morisot (1841–1895). He co-curated the exhibition Berthe Morisot: Impressionist (1987), organized by Mount Holyoke College Art Museum in association with the National Gallery of Art in Washington, DC, and contributed an essay to the accompanying catalogue. His essays on Morisot have also been published in Manet and the Sea (Philadelphia Museum of Art, 2003) Mujeres Impresionistas/Women Impressionists (Museo de Bellas Artes de Bilbao, 2001), and (the forthcoming) Berthe Morisot – Woman Impressionist (a 2018–2019 traveling exhibition organized by the Barnes Foundation, Philadelphia). He has also written on contemporary artists for exhibition catalogues and magazines.

In 1991, in memory of his parents, Scott donated a collection of works on paper by contemporary women artists to Bryn Mawr College. Since 2011 he is a board member and chair of the Collections Committee at Woodmere Art Museum in Philadelphia.

Style
Scott’s artworks blur the boundaries between abstraction and representation. Drawing from both nature and imagination, the paintings are not expressions of tangible realities but rather "ephemeral remembrances". Exploration of color and form stands at the core of Scott’s work, where blocks of color, patterns and line are overlapped to form dynamic compositions that appear visually akin to collage.

The paintings rely on extremely vivid color palettes, applied in fields of color that evoke both urban and pastoral scenes. In this sense, Scott’s work continues the tradition of abstracted landscapes mastered by aestheticist artists such as Whistler. The artist continually turns to flora and fauna for his subjects, stating that "underbrush and floral subjects have long been recurrent-if not paramount-to my painted imagery."

In the past decade many of Scott’s artworks display direct engagement with specific historical paintings by artists of particular significance to his own artistic development such as Pierre-Auguste Renoir (1841–1914), Berthe Morisot (1841–1895) and Henri Matisse (1869–1954). In paintings of the past decade their works imprint themselves directly onto Scott’s own work, whereby he translates formal qualities of these master’s works onto abstract and colorful canvases.

Select exhibitions
 2020 Hollis Taggart, New York, NY.
 2020 Lauren Rogers Museum of Art, Laurel, MS.
 2019 The Pierre Hotel, New York, NY.
 2018 Hollis Taggart Galleries, New York, NY.
 2017 Rider University, Lawrenceville, NJ.
 2017 Kentucky College of Art + Design, Louisville, KY.
 2016 Hollis Taggart Galleries, New York, NY. (also in 2015, 2014, 2013, 2011, 2009, 2007 and 2004).
 2016 Cerulean Arts Gallery, Philadelphia, (also in 2015).
 2014 C. R. Ettinger Studio, Philadelphia.
 2010 Albemarle Gallery, London (also in 2006).
 2008 List Gallery at Swarthmore College, Swarthmore, PA. 
 2008 The Print Center, Philadelphia.
 2002 Mangel Gallery, Philadelphia (also in 1999, 1998, 1996, 1994, 1992, and 1990).
 2000 Zone One Contemporary, Asheville, NC, (also in 1997).
 1999 Mulligan-Shanoski Gallery, San Francisco, (also in 1997 and 1996). 
 1997 Prince Street Gallery, New York, NY (also in 1995, 1993, and 1989).
 1994 Galerie LouLou Lasard, Berlin, Germany (with Marie-Theres Berger).
 1992 The State Museum, Harrisburg, PA.
 1987 Peale House Galleries of the Pennsylvania Academy of the Fine Arts, Philadelphia, (with Mary Nomecos).
 1984 Gross McCleaf Gallery, Philadelphia, (also in 1980).

References

Further reading 
 Berman, Avis, 'A Conversation with Bill Scott,' Bill Scott: Looking Through. Recent Oils and Prints (New York: Hollis Taggart Galleries, 2007), pp. 5–8.
 Cory, Jim, Tom Csaszar, Vincent Desiderio, Franklin Einspruch, Evan Fugazzi, Aubrey Levinthal, Charles Stucket, and William R. Valerio, Bill Scott: Leaf and Line (New York: Hollis Taggart Galleries, 2018).
 Gerdts, William. Two Centuries of American Still-Life Painting: The Frank and Michelle Hevrdejs Collection (Houston: Museum of Fine Arts, 2016), pp. 134–136, 280-281.
 Mattison, Robert S, In Arcadia: Paintings by Bill Scott (New York: Hollis Taggart Galleries, 2013), 4.  
 Rosenfeld, Jason, 'Bill Scott: Refulgence,' Bill Scott: Imagining Spring (New York: Hollis Taggart Galleries, 2016).
 Scott, Bill, 'Artist’s Statement,' Surviving Ourselves, Exhibition Catalogue (Philadelphia: Woodmere Art Museum, 2010), 22.
 Scott, Bill, Bill Scott: A Prolonged Moment (New York: Hollis Taggart, 2020).
 Zarobell, John, 'Form Reveal’s Art Secret: The Recent Work of Bill Scott,' Bill Scott (New York: Hollis Taggart Galleries, 2011).

External links
 Bill Scott Full Biography and Images - Hollis Taggart Galleries
 'Bill Scott.' Art in America. 2012
 Jennifer Samet, 'Beer with a Painter: Bill Scott,' Hyperallergic, 2016
 Stan Mir, 'Bill Scott’s Bittersweet Fictions,' Hyperallegic, December 17, 2016
 'Bill Scott’s Sunny Spectacles,' Observer, 2007

American contemporary painters
21st-century American painters
20th-century American painters
Painters from Pennsylvania
1956 births
Living people